Alexandra Caso Sierra (born April 25, 1987) is a volleyball player from the Dominican Republic, who competed for her native country at the 2004 Summer Olympics in Athens, Greece, wearing the number #6 jersey. There she ended up in eleventh place with the Dominican Republic women's national team. Caso played as a libero.

Playing with the Dominican Republic U-18 National Team, she won the "Best Libero", and the silver medal at the 2002 NORCECA Girls Youth Continental Championship U-18.

She claimed the gold medal with the national squad at the 2003 Pan American Games. Caso was named "Best Libero" at the 2005 NORCECA Championship.

Awards

Individuals
 2005 NORCECA Championship "Best Libero"
 2005 Salonpas Cup "Top Receiver"
 2002 NORCECA Girls Youth Continental Championship U-18 "Best Libero"

References

External links
 FIVB biography
 Norceca Press

1987 births
Living people
Dominican Republic women's volleyball players
Volleyball players at the 2004 Summer Olympics
Olympic volleyball players of the Dominican Republic
Volleyball players at the 2003 Pan American Games
Pan American Games gold medalists for the Dominican Republic
Pan American Games medalists in volleyball
Central American and Caribbean Games gold medalists for the Dominican Republic
Competitors at the 2002 Central American and Caribbean Games
Liberos
Central American and Caribbean Games medalists in volleyball
Medalists at the 2003 Pan American Games